Gillmeria rhusiodactyla is a moth of the family Pterophoridae with a type locality in Armenia.

Distribution areas are Armenia, Azerbaijan, southern part of European Russia, western Kazakhstan.

The forewings are rust brown. The hindwings are also rust brown, with lighter fringes.

References

Moths described in 1903
Platyptiliini
Endemic fauna of Armenia
Moths of Asia